Sukenari Yokoyama (January 1, 1884 – March 27, 1963) was a Japanese politician who served twice as governor of Hiroshima Prefecture in 1927–1928 and 1943–1944.

Biography
He was also governor of Okayama Prefecture (1923-1924), Ishikawa Prefecture (1927), Kyoto Prefecture (1931-1932), Kanagawa Prefecture (1932–1935) and Tokyo (1935-1937).

References

Governors of Hiroshima
1884 births
1963 deaths
Japanese Home Ministry government officials
Governors of Okayama Prefecture
Governors of Ishikawa Prefecture
Governors of Kyoto
Governors of Kanagawa Prefecture
Governors of Tokyo